Maintenance of way (commonly abbreviated to MOW) refers to the maintenance, construction, and improvement of rail infrastructure, including tracks, ballast, grade, and lineside infrastructure such as signals and signs.

Track 
The most fundamental maintenance of way task is the construction, repair, and replacement of the track and its supporting ballast and grade. The task was once done entirely by manual labor, but in the 21st century, track maintenance is largely done by specialized machines that are much faster and require fewer people to accomplish the same amount of work.

Electrification systems 

On rail lines, which include electrification by a third rail or an overhead line, maintenance of way work includes repairing and replacing the systems.

See also
Rail inspection
Railway track maintenance

Bibliography

References 

Permanent way
Rail transport operations